Region 1 was an administrative district in the city of Johannesburg, South Africa, from 2000 to 2006.  It is known as the Diepsloot region.  It bordered Region 2 (Midrand), Region 3 (Sandton), and Region 5 (Roodepoort). The region was abolished with a reorganisation of regions in 2006.

Region 1 was over 82 km2 and is sparsely populated.  It is mainly agricultural.  The main population centre is Diepsloot with a population of 56,000 people.  76% of people live in informal housing in this region.

References

Former regions of Johannesburg